Muessig, Müssig or Müßig is a German surname. Notable people with the surname include:

 Carolyn Muessig, British historian of religion
 Ulrike Müßig (born 1968), German jurist and legal historian  

German-language surnames